Sue Kerr is an American journalist best known for covering LGBT community with her blog Pittsburgh Lesbian Correspondents for nearly two decades. Her work has earned multiple GLAAD Media Awards. Kerr is also a national advocate for disability and LGBT rights.

About 
Sue Kerr lives the Manchester neighborhood of Pittsburgh, PA. She founded Pittsburgh Lesbian Correspondents in 2005 and serves its primary journalist. She is regarded as an important voice on LGBT issues in Pennsylvania politics. Kerr lives with a disability; it is a common topic of her writing and activism.

Kerr married her longtime partner on February 2, 2021. They had been together for 19 years prior. The pandemic wedding was co-officiated former Mayor of Pittsburgh Bill Peduto.

Activism 
In 2012, Kerr founded a campaign to reduce waste by stocking food pantries with reusable tote bags.

In the Summer of 2022, Kerr distributed over 700 “Protect Trans Kids” yard signs after a Pittsburgh teenager was the target of transphobic slurs. Kerr's sign campaign successfully brought attention to youth transgender rights movement. By that Fall, the City of Pittsburgh proclaimed September 12, 2022 'Protect Trans Kids Day' which was drafted with the help of three LGBTQ teens.

Awards  
Pittsburgh City Paper - Best Blogger 2016
30th GLAAD Media Awards - Outstanding Blog 2019
Pittsburgh City Paper - Best Blogger 2019
33rd GLAAD Media Awards - Outstanding Blog 2022
The Advocate - 2022 People Of The Year

References

External links 
 
 Sue Kerr on Twitter

Living people
LGBT people from Pennsylvania
American activist journalists
American bloggers
American columnists
American online journalists
American political journalists
American reporters and correspondents
1971 births